This was the first edition of the WCT World Doubles tennis tournament. The eight highest ranking teams qualified for the event. Third seeds, Robert Lutz and Stan Smith won the tournament in straight sets in the final against Tom Okker and Marty Riessen

Seeds

Draw

Finals

References
1973 WCT World Doubles Draw

World Championship Tennis World Doubles Draws
1973 World Championship Tennis circuit
1973 in Canadian tennis